The Teen Titans is a team of teenage comic book superheroes created by DC Comics. Portrayals of the team have undergone many iterations with different sets of characters. Alternate portrayals of the team have also been created through parallel universes in fiction, and the team has also been portrayed differently in other media, including television and video games.

Titans

Original Team (1960s–1970s)

New Teen Titans

Arsenal's Titans

The Atom Titans

The Titans

Teen Titans Post-"Graduation Day"

Ancillary teams

Titans West

Team Titans

Titans L.A.

Titans East

Deathstroke's Titans

The New 52 / DC Rebirth

"Forgotten" Teen Titans

Teen Titans (New 52)

Teen Titans (DC Rebirth)

Titans (DC Rebirth)

Defiance (Deathstroke's Titans)

Titans Academy

Titans reserves

Titans not in mainstream continuity

Kingdom Come & The Kingdom
The Kingdom Come Titans first appeared in 1996.

Titans Tomorrow
The Titans Tomorrow team is a future, anti-hero version of the Teen Titans and was first seen in 2005. The group, which is from "10 years in the future," first appeared prior to Infinite Crisis in the Titans Tomorrow storyline.

Titans West

Titans East

In other media

Teen Titans animated series
The main team consists of Robin (as leader), Beast Boy, Cyborg, Raven, and Starfire. They were joined by Terra for a brief period in the second season (she betrayed the Titans in the episode "Betrayal", but in "Aftershock Pt. 2" she sacrificed herself to save them and defeated Slade for the time being). Titans East was formed at the end of the third season with Bumblebee (as leader), along with Aqualad, Más y Menos, and Speedy. Several Titans were given honorary membership over the course of the series, and they were all seen in the episode "Calling all Titans".

DCAU

Injustice series

DC Animated Movie Universe's Teen Titans

Titans series

In order of joining the team, then order of appearance in the series.

References

External links
Titans Tower

Teen Titans
Members